Kusnyshcha is a village in western Ukraine, in the Kovel Raion in Volyn Oblast, but was formerly administered within Liuboml Raion.
The population of the village is just about 1800 people and covers an area of 4,19 km2.  Local government is administered by Kusnyshchanska village council. 
Kusnyshcha located in the Liuboml Raion  along the Highway T0308 Ukraine – Liuboml – Shatsk – Brest.
The first mention of Kusnyshcha in written sources belong to 1564. But according to others sources, the settlement was founded back in 1510.

References

External links 
 Kusnyshcha (Kusnishha, Kuśniszcze, Kusnyshcha) on the online Yandex map (satellite) with streets and house numbers
 village Kusnyshcha
 weather.in.ua

Populated places established in 1510

Villages in Kovel Raion